Hot Thoughts is the ninth studio album by American rock band Spoon. It was released on March 17, 2017, through Matador Records. It is also the first Spoon album since 2002's Kill the Moonlight to not feature multi-instrumentalist Eric Harvey, who quietly left the band after finishing a world tour in support of 2014's They Want My Soul.

Reception

Hot Thoughts received acclaim from music critics. At Metacritic, which assigns a normalized rating out of 100 to reviews from mainstream critics, the album received an average score of 82, based on 30 reviews, indicating "universal acclaim".

Jillian Mapes of Pitchfork wrote "Spoon stay in their well-earned lane but tweak the formula just enough on their ninth album, keeping their reliably great songwriting and adding new, electronic textures."

Accolades

Track listing

Personnel 
Credits adapted from liner notes for Hot Thoughts

Spoon
Britt Daniel – vocals, guitars, keys, piano, percussion, bass
Jim Eno – drums, percussion, keys
Alex Fischel – keyboards, piano, guitars, percussion
Rob Pope – bass, percussion
 
Production
 Spoon – production, recording, mixing
 Dave Fridmann – production, recording, mixing
 Brad Bell – engineering
 Matt Gerhard – engineering
 Mike Fridmann – engineering
 Max Lorenzen – engineering
 Grant Eppley – engineering
 Howie Weinberg – mastering
 Gentry Studer – mastering
 Janet Weiss – song sequencing

Additional musicians
Sabrina Ellis – vocals (track 8)
Sara Houser – vocals (tracks 4, 6 and 8)
Stephen Patterson – extra drums (track 5)
Blair Robbins – vocals (tracks 4, 6 and 8)
Brad Shenfeld – darbuka, saz (track 5)
Ted Taforo – saxophone (track 10)
Sharon Van Etten – vocals (track 4)
 
Artwork
 Christine Messersmith – cover image
 Alan Hynes – design
 Britt Daniel – design

Charts

References 

2017 albums
Matador Records albums
Spoon (band) albums
Albums produced by Dave Fridmann
Albums recorded at Tarbox Road Studios